The Akron Yankees were a minor league baseball team that existed from 1935 until 1941. A class C farm team of the New York Yankees, the club was based in Akron, Ohio and played in the Middle Atlantic League.

Year-by-year record

Baseball teams established in 1935
Baseball teams disestablished in 1941
Defunct minor league baseball teams
New York Yankees minor league affiliates
1935 establishments in Ohio
1941 disestablishments in Ohio
Defunct baseball teams in Ohio
Middle Atlantic League teams